Out on Blue Six may refer to:

 Out on Blue Six (show), BBC Radio One show
 Out on Blue Six (novel), written by Ian McDonald